The Chronicles of Narnia: The Voyage of the Dawn Treader (Original Motion Picture Soundtrack) is the soundtrack to the film The Chronicles of Narnia: The Voyage of the Dawn Treader. David Arnold composed the soundtrack, which was released on December 7, 2010 in the United States by Sony Classical.

The song "There's a Place for Us" by Carrie Underwood was nominated for Best Original Song at the 68th Golden Globe Awards.

Background 
It was announced on October 9, 2007 that award-winning composer David Arnold would score the film with the themes composed by Harry Gregson-Williams (who scored The Lion, The Witch and The Wardrobe and Prince Caspian). It was Arnold's fourth collaboration with Apted after The World Is Not Enough, Enough and Amazing Grace. The second trailer for The Voyage of the Dawn Treader uses identical music to the trailer for The Lion, the Witch and the Wardrobe.

As the previous films were distributed by Disney, the soundtracks for those films were released by Walt Disney Records.  However, this film was distributed by 20th Century Fox (which is now owned by Disney), and the soundtrack was released by Sony Music.

Recording

Score 
Arnold worked with an 87-piece Orchestra and a 40-piece choir to record the score for the film. He also worked with Paul Apted (Michael Apted's son) in editing the score, remarking that it was "going to be epic.". Arnold chose not to collaborate with Lisbeth Scott, whose vocals are used to the first two films. He created specific themes for The Dawn Treader and Reepicheep. In order for the film to be consistent with the franchise, he chose to use the previous themes by Gregson-Williams for the opening and closing scenes, as well as for scenes featuring some recurring characters, such as Aslan.

The scoring sessions took place during September 2010 and were completed on October 8, 2010.

Songs 
Carrie Underwood recorded a song entitled "There's a Place for Us", which she co-wrote with David Hodges and Hillary Lindsey, that was released on November 16, 2010 as a lead single and can only be purchased exclusive on iTunes.  It has sold 77,000 copies as of January 20, 2010 . This song was also covered by various artists for international releases of the film, including E.M.D., Xander de Buisonjé, Sergey Lazarev, Victoria S, Sonohra, and Joe McElderry, who released it as the b-track to his single "Someone Wake Me Up".

Sreeram Chandra recorded a song entitled "Rehnuma" in Hindi, Tamil, and Telugu which was featured for the Indian release of the film. Australian singer Stan Walker also recorded an original song "Stand Up" for the film's Australian release.

Track listing

International versions

Reception 

The soundtrack had met with generally favourable reviews from critics. Allmusic.com gave the soundtrack 3½ stars out of 5, saying 
"Voyage of the Dawn Treader, the third installment in Walden Media's popular Chronicles of Narnia series, features the work of Grammy Award-winning composer David Arnold (Casino Royale, Independence Day). Arnold, who has taken the reins from previous author Harry Gregson-Williams, incorporates many of the latter composer’s main themes, which, when paired with Arnold’s more frenetic, modern action cues, echo the third act’s penchant for pure unadulterated fantasy. Arnold truly makes the score his own on the 11-minute “Into Battle” sequence, which boasts some truly impressive Wagnerian choral sections."

Personnel 

 David Arnold - Primary Artist, Track Performer, Composer, Score Producer, Choir Contractor
 Nicholas Dodd - Conductor
 Frank Ricotti - Ethnic Percussion
 Dermot Crehan - Irish Fiddle
 Mauricio Venegas - Woodwind
 Paul Clarvis - Ethnic Percussion
 Jan Hendrickse - Penny Whistle, Duduk
 Synergy Vocals - Choir, Chorus
 King Alfred School Girls' Choir - Girl's Choir
 Green Mist Choir - Choir, Chorus
 Byron Wallon - Ram's Horn
 Nicholas Dodd - Orchestration
 John Bradbury - Orchestra Leader
 Michael Price - Additional Music
 Geoff Foster - Score Producer, Engineering
 Rob Playford - MIDI Tech, Computer Engineering
 Ray Staff - Mastering
 Tom Cavanaugh - Music Business Affairs
 Harry Gregson-Williams - Composer
 Chris Barrett - Recording Assistant
 Micaela Haslam - Choir Contractor
 Chris Cozens - Auricle Programming
 Mark Cavell - Licensing
 Matt Robertson - MIDI Programming
 Adam Miller - Recording Assistant
 Isabelle Tulliez - Product Development
 Jo Buckley - Assistant Contractor
 Jenny O'Grady - Choir Contractor
 Stu Kennedy - MIDI Programming
 David Hearn - MIDI Programming

References

External links 

 

2010 soundtrack albums
2010s film soundtrack albums
Sony Music soundtracks
The Chronicles of Narnia music
David Arnold soundtracks
The Chronicles of Narnia (film series)
Fantasy film soundtracks
Adventure film soundtracks